Slavery is noted in the are later known as Algeria since antiquity. 

Between the 16th-century and the early 19th-century, Algeria was a major center of the Barbary slave trade of Europeans, captured by the barbary pirates in the Atlantic and Mediterranean Sea, and forced sold on the slave market to Slavery on the Barbary Coast. The slave trade of Europeans ended after the Barbary wars in the early 19th-century.  

Since antiquity, Algeria was a center of the Trans-Saharan slave trade of enslaved Africans from Sub Saharan Africa across the Sahara desert to the Mediterranean world. The slave trade from sub-Saharan Africa continued openly until the mid 19th-century.

Both slavery and slave trade were banned in Algeria in 1848.

See also
 History of slavery in the Muslim world
 History of concubinage in the Muslim world
 Human trafficking in the Middle East

References

 Roger Botte, Esclavages et abolitions en terres d'islam. Tunisie, Arabie saoudite, Maroc, Mauritanie, Soudan, éd. André Versailles, Bruxelles, 2010, ISBN 287495084X.
 Jamil M. Abun-Nasr:A History of the Maghrib in the Islamic Period
 Marc Weitzmann:Hate: The New Brew of an Ancient Poison
 W. Mulligan, M. Bric:A Global History of Anti-Slavery Politics in the Nineteenth Century
 Pedro Ramos Pinto, Bertrand Taithe:The Impact of History?: Histories at the Beginning of the 21st Century
 Mary Ann Fay:Slavery in the Islamic World: Its Characteristics and Commonality
 Julia A. Clancy-Smith:Mediterraneans: North Africa and Europe in an Age of Migration, C. 1800–1900
 Jonathan Derrick:Africa's Slaves Today
 Martin A. Klein, Suzanne Miers:Slavery and Colonial Rule in Africa
 Benjamin Claude Brower:Benjamin Claude Brower
 Allan Christelow:Muslim Law Courts and the French Colonial State in Algeria

Algeria
Society of Algeria
Human rights abuses in Algeria
Anti-black racism in Africa